Kitty Leroy (1850 – December 6, 1877) was a dancer, gambler, saloon owner, prostitute, madam, and trick shooter of the American Old West.

Leroy was born in Michigan and by the age of 10 she was dancing professionally. By the time she was fourteen she was performing in dance halls and saloons. She also had developed shooting skills that few could match, including the ability to shoot apples off people's heads. She married for the first time by 15, but the marriage was short-lived. She ventured west seeking her fortune, settling for a time in Dallas, Texas. By the age of 20, she had married a second time and was one of the most popular dancing attractions in town. She soon gave up dancing to work as a faro dealer and became known for dressing in men's clothing, and at times like a Romani. By this time, Leroy had developed into a skilled gambler.

She and her second husband headed to California, where they hoped to open their own saloon. Somewhere along the line, she left him for another man, marrying for a third time. However, this marriage was extremely short-lived. According to an unconfirmed legend, the two became involved in an argument, during which she challenged him to a gunfight. When he refused to fight her because she was a woman, she changed into men's clothing and challenged him again. When she drew her gun, he did not, and she shot him. As he did not die right away, she called for a preacher and the two were married. He died within a few days.

Leroy made her way to Deadwood, Dakota Territory, in 1876, traveling in the same wagon train as Calamity Jane and Wild Bill Hickok.  There, she worked as a prostitute in the brothel managed by Mollie Johnson. She opened the Mint Gambling Saloon and married for a fourth time to a Prussian prospector. However, when his money ran out, they began to argue often. She hit him over the head with a bottle one night and threw him out, ending the relationship.

Her saloon was successful. In addition to the gambling income, Leroy occasionally worked as a prostitute but mostly managed her own women. On June 11, 1877, Leroy married for the fifth and final time, this time to prospector and gambler Samuel R. Curley. This marriage, as her others, was volatile. Curley was alleged to have been extremely jealous and Leroy continued to have affairs, one of which was with her latest ex-husband, and another, according to rumor, with Wild Bill Hickok. On the night of December 6, 1877, Curley shot and killed Leroy in the Lone Star Saloon, then turned the gun on himself and committed suicide. The pair were laid in state in front of the saloon the next day, then buried together. The January 7, 1878 issue of the Black Hills Daily Times of Deadwood, under "City and Vicinity", reported: 
The estate of Kitty Curley upon appraisment, amounted to $650. More than one-half of which is c[l]aimed by and allowed to Kitty Donally, and the ezpenses have doubtless consumed the balance. P.H. Earley has been appointed trustee or guardian for the child.

She is mentioned in the HBO series Deadwood, portrayed as a beautiful murder victim.

References

External links
Legends of America, Kitty Leroy
Poker Players Legends

People from Michigan
People from Deadwood, South Dakota
1850 births
1877 deaths
People of the American Old West
American gamblers
American prostitutes
Sex workers murdered in the United States
Saloonkeepers
American brothel owners and madams
American murder victims
People murdered in South Dakota
Deaths by firearm in South Dakota
19th-century American businesspeople
Murder–suicides in South Dakota
 1877 murders in the United States
 uxoricides
History of women in South Dakota